Satyria is a genus of flowering plants in the blueberry tribe Vaccinieae, family Ericaceae, native to southern Mexico, Central America, and northern South America. It is closely related to Cavendishia.

Species
, accepted species included:

References

Vaccinioideae
Ericaceae genera